C.Y. O'Connor Beach is a beach in the suburb of North Coogee, south of Fremantle, Western Australia. It extends from McTaggart Cove in the south to Catherine Point in the north and is also known as the CY O'Connor reserve. The C.Y. O'Connor sculpture is one of the features of the beach; the statue is situated in the ocean about 30 meters off the shoreline. The statute acknowledges that this is where Charles Yelverton O'Connor rode his horse into the surf and committed suicide.

Previously the beach and adjoining land was part of Robb's Jetty Abattoir. The jetty was built in 1870s and closed down in 1992, with the jetty and associated buildings removed in 1994.

References

City of Cockburn
Beaches of Western Australia